Julia Khakimova (born 28 February 1981) is a Russian foil fencer.

Khakimova won the gold medal in the foil team event at the 2006 World Fencing Championships after beating Italy in the final.  She accomplished this with her team mates Aida Shanayeva, Svetlana Boyko and Ianna Rouzavina.

At the 2005 Summer Universiade, Khakimova won a bronze medal in the individual women's foil event.

In 2013 Julia along with her husband, former head coach of the Russian National Junior Team Vadim Ayupov, opened their own fencing club - the United Fencing Academy (UFA), in Woodland Hills, CA.

References

External links
 Profile at the  FIE

1981 births
Living people
Russian female foil fencers
Universiade medalists in fencing
Place of birth missing (living people)
Universiade bronze medalists for Russia
Medalists at the 2005 Summer Universiade
21st-century Russian women